Barmer railway station is a main railway station in Barmer district, Rajasthan. Its code is BME. It serves Barmer city. The station consists of three platforms. The platforms are well sheltered.

Trains 

Some of the trains that run from Barmer are:

 Barmer jodhpur express
 Yesvantpur–Barmer AC Express
 Barmer Jodhpur DEMU
 Barmer Howrah SF
 Barmar–Rishikesh Express
 Barmer–Guwahati Express
 Barmer–Jodhpur Passenger
 Barmer–Munabao Passenger
 Barmer Jammu tavi
 Delhi–Barmer Link Express
 Barmer–Jaipur Superfast Express

References

Railway stations in Barmer district
Jodhpur railway division
Transport in Barmer, Rajasthan